Lee Hsing, or Li Hsing (born ; 20 May 1930 – 19 August 2021) was a Taiwanese film director. He directed more than 30 films between 1959 and 1986.

Li Zida was born in Shanghai in 1930, and settled in Taiwan in 1948, studying at National Taiwan Normal University. Li taught for one year, then became a reporter for the Independence Evening Post, a newspaper published by his father , in 1954. While covering culture, education, and entertainment for the Post, Li also acted in a few films. Having acted and assistant-directed for mentor/filmmaker Tang Shao-hua, Li's directorial debut was as co-director for Brother Liu and Brother Wang on the Roads in Taiwan, a two-part film released in 1959. Until 1962, Li worked primarily on Hokkien films, despite being unable to speak Taiwanese Hokkien. His first Mandarin film,  was Our Neighbors. He received a National Cultural Award in 2015. 

Li died on 19 August 2021, aged 91, of heart failure.

Filmography
Three films directed by Li won the Best Director Golden Horse Award:
 1961 Empress Wu
 1962 The Liar Ah Chi 
 1962 The Five Difficult Traps 
 1962 The Liar Ah Chi part II 
 Our Neighbors (1963)
 Oyster Girl (1964)
 Beautiful Duckling (1964)
 Execution in Autumn (1972)
 He Never Gives Up (1978)
 The Heroic Pioneers (1986)

other selected filmography:
 The Silent Wife (1965)
 The Young Ones (1973)
 Rhythm of the Wave (1974)
 The Story of a Small Town (1978)

References

External links

1930 births
2021 deaths
Taiwanese film directors
Film directors from Shanghai
Taiwanese people from Shanghai
National Taiwan Normal University alumni
20th-century Taiwanese educators
Taiwanese journalists
Taiwanese schoolteachers
20th-century Taiwanese male actors
Taiwanese male film actors